Volker Hage (born 9 September 1949 in Hamburg) is a retired German journalist, author and literary critic, who has reinvented himself as a novelist.

Life 
Hage began his career as a journalist in 1975 as an editor for Frankfurter Allgemeine Zeitung, working initially for the Literature section and later for the newspaper's weekly “FAZ Magazin” colour supplement. From 1986 through to 1992 he was chief literary editor of another leading (West) German newspaper, Die Zeit, for which he subsequently has continued to write.   Since 1992 he has worked on Der Spiegel where he has served as culture editor (“Redakteur im Kulturressort”). He was the founder of the periodical  “Deutsche Literatur” (“German Literature”), published by Reclam and he has produced various anthologies and collections.

From 1988 through to 1994 Hage was a member of the jury for the annual Ingeborg Bachmann Prize contest, which is an event broadcast on television of Austria, Germany and Switzerland. More recently, in 2005 and 2006, he sat on the jury for the German Book Prize.

Volker Hage has written biographies of Max Frisch, Walter Kempowski, John Updike, Philip Roth and (combined with Mathias Schreiber) of Marcel Reich-Ranicki. He has also been involved in rediscovering the ”realist” genre work of the writer Gert Ledig.  This came during the course of Hage’s contributions to the debates, initiated by Max Sebald, about the literary treatment of the bombing of German cities during the Second World War. Hage was particularly effective as an advocate for Ledig’s second novel, Vergeltung, a powerfully apocalyptical and autobiographical anti-war narrative.

In an engagingly two-edged assessment, fellow critic Marcel Reich-Ranicki wrote that Hage’s style of literary criticism had the great advantage that you always knew in advance precisely what he wanted to say.

As a retired journalist Hage has begun to reinvent himself as a novelist. He has published in 2015 the novel Die freie Liebe concerning a love triangle amidst the cultural changes of the 1970s in Germany. The biographic novel Des Lebens fünfter Akt (Luchterhand 2018) narrates the last years of the life of Austrian writer Arthur Schnitzler.

Publications 
 Max Frisch (Rowohlts Monographien 321). Rowohlt, Reinbek 1983, 
 Alles erfunden: Porträts deutscher und amerikanischer Autoren. Rowohlt, Reinbek 1988, 
 Marcel Reich-Ranicki. Kiepenheuer und Witsch, Köln 1995,  (gemeinsam mit Mathias Schreiber)
 Auf den Spuren der Dichtung. Reisen zu berühmten Schauplätzen der Literatur. Goldmann, München 1997, 
 Propheten im eigenen Land. Auf der Suche nach der deutschen Literatur. Deutscher Taschenbuchverlag, München 1999, 
 Zeugen der Zerstörung: die Literaten und der Luftkrieg. S. Fischer, Frankfurt am Main 2003, 
 John Updike: eine Biographie. Rowohlt, Reinbek 2007, 
 Letzte Tänze, erste Schritte: deutsche Literatur der Gegenwart. Deutsche Verlagsanstalt, München 2007, 
 Philip Roth. Bücher und Begegnungen. Hanser, München 2008, 
 Kritik für Leser: Vom Schreiben über Literatur, Suhrkamp Verlag, Berlin 2009, 
 Schiller. Vom Feuerkopf zum Klassiker. btb Verlag, München 2009, 
 Walter Kempowski, Bücher und Begegnungen. Knaus Verlag, München 2009, 
 Max Frisch - Sein Leben in Bildern und Texten, Suhrkamp Verlag, Berlin 2011, 
 Die freie Liebe, Luchterhand Literaturverlag, München 2015, 
 Des Lebens fünfter Akt: Roman, Luchterhand, München 2018,

Notes and source 

1949 births
Journalists from Hamburg
German male journalists
German literary critics
20th-century German non-fiction writers
Living people
20th-century German male writers
Der Spiegel people